Timbó is a municipality in the state of Santa Catarina in the South region of Brazil.
It is located at 26º49'24" from latitude South and 49º16'18" from longitude west, at an altitude of 68 meters. Its population in 2020 was 44,977 inhabitants. 
It has an area of 130.31 km ².

History 
German immigrants, led by Frederico Donner, settled at the confluence of the rivers Benedito and of Cedros, that came from the Colony of Blumenau. 
Italian immigrants also arrived later, and today each of these two ethnic groups account for almost 50%. 
Most immigrants who arrived in Timbó came from Germany (Pomerania and Hamburg) and from Italy (Chiavenna and Trent). 
Timbó was founded on October 12, 1869, and elevated to a municipality on March 25, 1934.

Touristic Sights 
 Azul Hill, original  Morro Azul ("Freymund Germer Ecological Park")
It is 18 km from the city center. It is the highest point of Timbo, with 758 meters of altitude. The top is equipped with a ramp to practice gliding, structure for camping and a wonderful view. On the way, among winding streets, there are many traditional old houses with beautiful landscapes.

 Botanical Garden ("Franz Damm Exhibition Park")
Located in the city center. It has a large green area with lakes, structure for camping, barbecue grills, restaurant and ecological trails.	

 Morro Arapongas
Viewpoint of the city, 6 kilometers from downtown; most frequented by people who likes adventure and sports, mainly to practice free flight (gliding).

 Benedito River Dam
Built in 1880 by German immigrants, is in the center of Timbó. Access is by Oscar Bremer Square, with its century-old fig tree. Approaching it, the environment is calmer, despite being inserted in the urban context.

 Museum of the Music - Hall Hammermeister
Musical instruments of five centuries exposed in a ballroom built in the early 20th century. Inaugurated on 19 September 2004, houses a collection of over a thousand pieces, including musical instruments, sheet music, technical drawings, books and accessories. Located on Edmundo Bell Street, Highway SC477, km 5th.

 Museum of the Immigrant
The Museum of the Immigrant is located at the Avenue Getúlio Vargas - Downtown.

 House of the Poet Lindolf Bell
The House of the Poet Lindolf Bell was inaugurated on December 11, 2003, and aims to present the Museum - which aims to preserve and keep alive the shape, style and the roots of Bell's life - core memory - which is composed of documents and photographs - library - containing books of poetry, poems and short stories whose authorship of Santa Catarina and authors from other parts of Brazil - Square - Art of Grace - The square can be visited any time of day and night. Located between the streets and Quintino Bocaiuva and Botuverá.

See also
List of municipalities in Santa Catarina

References

Municipalities in Santa Catarina (state)